The 2018–19 of the Finnish Basketball Cup is at its 33rd edition.

The competition was interrupted in 2013 and resumed for the season 2018–19. The Opening match was played on 30 October 2018.

Format 
Every Finnish basketball team from any league could join voluntarily the Finnish Basketball Cup. The competition is structured in single game play-off series, with the exception that the teams that lose at the first and second round have a second chance to qualify by playing an additional play-out round.

Teams

First round 
In the first round all the teams qualify to the second round, no matter what the result is. But the winners from the first round play against each other in a single game play-off format, while the losers go in a play-out round.

Second round 
The second round play-offs are played amongst the teams that won in the first round. The winning teams go directly to the fourth round, while the losing teams play an extra third round with the chance to qualify to the fourth round.

The play-outs are played amongst the teams that lost the first play off round. The losing teams are out from the competition, while the winning teams play in the additional round against the losing team from the play-offs of the second round, with a chance to qualify to the fourth round.

Play off

Play out

Third round 
In the third round the teams who won the play-outs play against the teams that lost the second round of play-offs. The winners will qualify to the fourth round and will play against the teams that won the second round of play-offs

Bracket 
The final stage is played in single match quarters, semifinals and final.

Final

References

2018–19 in European basketball leagues
2018–19 in Finnish basketball